Feklistova or Feklistov Island (Остров Феклистова; Ostrov Feklistova) is one of the Shantar Islands in Sea of Okhotsk.

Geography
Feklistov Island is covered with taiga forest and has a  lake on its northern shore separated from the sea by a spit of land.

Administratively this island belongs to the Khabarovsk Krai of the Russian Federation.

This island is part of the "Kondyor-Feklistov metallogenic belt" (KD) owing to the presence of placers  which include minerals like "blacksand platinum".
The "Kondyor-Feklistov metallogenic belt" is one of the major metallogenic belts of Northeast Asia. It is assumed that it formed by an oblique subduction of the oceanic crust of the Mongol-Okhotsk paleoocean under the southern margin of the Siberian continent.

History
Between 1852 and 1889, American whaleships cruised for bowhead whales off Feklistova Island. They also anchored in Lebyazhya Bay on the south side of the island to stow down or boil oil, flense whales, and obtain wood and water or shelter from storms. They referred to the anchorage itself as Feklistova Harbor. As many as forty-two ships could be anchored in Lebyazhya Bay at one time.

References

External links
 Satellite view for Ostrov Feklistova
 Pictures

Shantar Islands
Islands of the Sea of Okhotsk
Islands of the Russian Far East
Islands of Khabarovsk Krai